The 1928 SMU Mustangs football team represented Southern Methodist University during the 1928 college football season, their 13th season in existence.

Their year began with two easy victories against the outmatched Denton(Texas) Normal Teachers' College (known in later years as the University of North Texas) and Howard Payne.

These games led into what could be seen as the highlight of the year, a contest against Army, already a national college football juggernaut. Although they could not win, they came within a point of victory against the powerhouse.

SMU survived a scare returning to Texas, defeating Simmons College (now Hardin-Simmons) by only 6-0 in Wichita Falls, although SMU did not play its regular players, who were still feeling fatigue returning from the Army game at West Point.

The Mustangs began their conference schedule against Rice with another convincing victory, and then added another victory against non-conference foe Trinity. However, their momentum was shattered with a difficult loss to the University of Texas, the eventual conference champions.

That Texas game would prove to be pivotal for the Mustangs in the race for the conference crown, as SMU ended the season with a tie against A&M and then two consecutive conference losses, finishing with a homecoming game  loss against TCU where the entire coaching staff was out with the flu.

The campaign marked SMU's first with an All-American, with left guard and team co-captain Henry Jack "Choc" Sanders earning the honors from The New York Sun

Schedule

References

SMU
SMU Mustangs football seasons
SMU Mustangs football